Riverplace or River Place may refer to:

 Riverplace Tower, a skyscraper in Jacksonville, Florida, United States
 Riverplace (JTA Skyway), a JTA Skyway station in Jacksonville, Florida
 Riverplace, a housing and office complex across from Saint Anthony Main in Minneapolis, Minnesota
 RiverPlace, a neighborhood located on the waterfront in downtown Portland, Oregon
River Place, Detroit